KOME was a commercial FM radio station in San Jose, California, broadcasting at 98.5 MHz.  KOME was on the air from 1971 through 1998. Currently, the 98.5 FM frequency is home to KUFX "K-Fox," a classic rock station.

An unrelated FM station in Tolar, Texas, airing a classic hits radio format in the western section of the Dallas-Fort Worth Metroplex, currently uses the KOME call sign.  It broadcasts at 95.5 MHz, and is owned by Chisholm Trail Communications.

History

KRPM
On July 1, 1959, the station first signed on the air.  It was owned by Edward W. Meece, one of the founders of Pacifica Radio.  Meece formed The Audio House, Inc., and got the Federal Communications Commission to issue a construction permit for the radio station to be built.

KRPM's original format was classical music.  It was only powered at 3,300 watts, so its signal was only available in and around San Jose.

Free-form KOME
Meece sold The Audio House, Inc, with KRPM, for roughly $300,000 in February 1971 to Mel Gollub of Pennsylvania and Ron Cutler.  The station's call letters were changed to KOME, and the format became free-form rock.

The station allowed its disc jockeys to choose their music from a vast and diverse library of rock, jazz, blues and R&B vinyl albums. It would not be uncommon to hear The Beatles, Jimi Hendrix, The Who and The Allman Brothers in the same show where you'd hear Issac Hayes, James Taylor, Stevie Wonder, The Crusaders, Grover Washington, Jr., Laura Nyro and Joni Mitchell. Music sets were often themed as "Who'll Stop the Rain," "I Wish It Would Rain" and "Riders on the Storm." Or you could hear a themed set of only Motown songs. But the emphasis at KOME from 1971 to 1974 was on each DJ having a show with its own music personality. And segues (blending two songs together as one ends and one begins) was always part of the presentation.

KOME first originated from studios in the Pruneyard Shopping Center in Campbell in the Towers building on the 13th floor. Later, KOME moved to an old house on The Alameda in San Jose. Radio veteran, Bob Simmons became their Program Director in 1972 and remained for a year, taking charge of the jocks and designing the iconic black and yellow diamond KOME sticker. DJs from 1971 to 1975 included Cese McGowan, Uncle Jack Tossman, Gary T., Phil Charles, Michael "Mother" Deal, Wolf (Rick Ricketts), Wapaho Joe (Amadeo), Joe Kelly, Dick Baribou, Captain Reif/Jim Reifschneider, Mark Sherry, Victor Boc, J. William Weed and The Lobster (Paul Wells).  The DJs each had their own personalities while on the air. Cese was laid back and was quite eclectic with an emphasis on folk music. Uncle Jack was a Beatles, Moody Blues and Crosby, Stills, Nash & Young fan with an engaging personality. Mother Deal was a prankster on the air, a straight-ahead rocker who loved novelty songs like "My Ding-a-Ling."  And Wolf (Ricky Ricketts) was serious about constructing engaging sets and segues.  He would regularly come up with songs the listeners never heard before, styles you hadn't heard before, and types of music you may have never considered before.  Lobster, Joe Kelly, and Wapaho Joe were progressive rock guys who enjoyed playing Nektar, Genesis (band) and Robin Trower but all could easily stretch out to fusion of any kind, especially jazz-rock fusion artists such as Jeff Beck.

Moving toward playlists
In 1973, Cliff Feldman was put in charge of the jocks and format as KOME's Program Director. In 1974, KOME management appointed a new program director, Ed Romig from ABC owned rock station WDAI-FM in Chicago (now WLS-FM).  As other progressive stations were moving toward more researched rock playlists, Romig ended the free-form format, mandating the use of index cards with specific songs to be played.  This became a time of transition from progressive radio disc-jockeys whose shows had music personalities to be replaced by air personalities and strict music formats.

Romig brought in Peter B. Collins from Chicago, and hired Jona Denz, Dana Jang, and Gene Mitchell. In August 1977, Mikel Herrington (previously known as "Captain Mikey") was made Program Director and discarded the card catalog playlist in favor of allowing jocks to select "playable" tracks from an eclectic library of art rock, punk, new wave, country rock, heavy metal, oldies, and comedy. Local bands such as Hush and Cornell Hurd often got airplay. Herrington hosted the morning show and hired Barry Corkery, Dennis Erectus, Laurie Roberts, Mark Goldberg, Kelly Cox, Larry Jacobs, Greg McClure and Joe Regelski.

KOME attracted a loyal South Bay rock audience throughout the 1970s, 1980s, and early 1990s, against original San Jose FM rock rival 92.3 KSJO. Both stations managed to also serve listeners in the larger neighboring San Francisco radio market, against well-known progressive rock leader 94.9 KSAN (now KYLD), programmed by Tom Donohue.

Slogans and logos
KOME's stickers were a common sight on vehicles and high school lockers around the area. Several on-air slogans suggested the sexual connotations of its call letters, probably the most memorable being "Don't touch that dial, it's got "KOME" on it!" as well as others saying things like "K-O-M-E all over your radio dial," "You've got KOME... oozing out of your speakers," "Wake up with KOME in your ear," and "The KOME spot on your radio dial."  Playboy magazine found this newsworthy enough to mention the station.

KOME black-on-yellow diamond stickers were designed in 1972 and became an instant hit. For a short time in 1974, a round zig-zaggy design was tried but was retired quickly. As an alternative the diamond was brought back with reverse colors. The famous KOME diamond stickers have been spotted all around the world. Listeners soon became highly creative, cutting up the decals to read new phrases.  The "Our Decal" slogan on the stickers lent itself to other "KOME Paraphernalia" such as pinbacks, patches, nightlights, glass, T-shirts, and even the payroll checks said "Our Checks" on them. The later "Rock Radio" era eliminated the "Our Decal" and replaced it with "FM," as well as producing some with a digital typeface. Both eras produced limited edition decals promoting bands of the day such as The Rolling Stones, The Who and Bruce Springsteen.

Changing ownership
In 1973 a group of New Yorkers led by former Metromedia executives Michael A. Wiener and Gerald Carrus, who later named their company Infinity Broadcasting, acquired KOME as the first of numerous FM rock acquisitions which soon would include WIVY in Jacksonville, Florida in 1977 and WBCN in Boston in 1979.   They moved the studios to a location on Winchester Blvd near Payne Avenue in San Jose in early 1974.

Newscasts
News on KOME was taken seriously, but allowed for room to expand to clever parodies of news events of the day. Early reporters included Lynn Ryder and Victor Boc, who also hosted The Expressway talk show on Sunday mornings. Victor became well known for his interviews with over-the-top guests like "Squeaky" Fromme, Sylvia Browne, Mae Brussel, and "The Two".

In the early '80s, news often turned hilarious as current events were transformed into skits that rivaled those of popular comedy troupe, The Credibility Gap The Credibility Gap through the efforts of Production Director Jack Perry and News staffers Rob Singleton, Joe Regelski, and Mark Goldberg.

In the latter years, the morning team of Blazy and Bob integrated news into mornings, since Bob Lilley was both reporter and side-kick.

1980s–1990s
KOME's reputation for irreverence, raunchy fun, and a broad music format continued into the 1980s. Mikel Hunter and his crew became known for oddball station promotions like the Chicken-Fly and the KOME Party Crashers. KOME enjoyed good ratings in both San Jose and San Francisco during this era.

According to an article in Metro, KOME's freeform ethic ended around 1982, when Infinity Broadcasting cut back the station's playlist and enlisted radio programming consultant Jeff Pollack.  Mikel Hunter, who earlier had great success programming KMET in Los Angeles, left the station in protest. He spent the next few years doing radio in Las Vegas, Philadelphia and finally back in Northern California at KVYN in Napa Valley, California.

In 1983, PD Les Tracy hardened the format to a mostly heavy metal playlist.  Tracy and the hard rock sound lasted less than a year.  Due to poor ratings, KOME management released Tracy, and new PD Pat Evans reverted KOME to its previous approach.

The era between 1984 and 1994 were also ratings winners with personalities such as Blazy & Bob, Stephen Page, "Weird Old Uncle Frank" Bennett, Scott Lewis and the return of Dennis Erectus. KOME won the Rolling Stone Readers' Poll as "Station of the Year" in both 1988 and 1990, landing the station on the cover of the music magazine. Local, national and international live broadcasts and innovative promotions kept the station in the forefront of rock radio.

KOME's sound became a blend of alternative rock and new wave music in May 1994. Syndicated programming such as The Howard Stern Show and Loveline were featured on the station.

Final days
In 1997, Infinity Broadcasting, which had recently merged with CBS, purchased KITS "Live 105," San Francisco from Entercom.  Both stations were run with identical formats for a short time. In May 1998 the company acquired American Radio Systems and was legally required to sell one of its existing stations. 
Infinity opted to sell the 98.5 frequency to Jacor, owners of longtime rival KSJO. Jacor transferred the classic rock station format heard on KUFX and its call sign to the newly acquired frequency.  This meant the end of the KOME call letters on June 19, 1998.

CBS/Infinity transferred three members of KOME's air staff, Ally Storm, No Name, and Janine Siegel plus the syndicated Howard Stern and Loveline shows to KITS as "The New Live 105". The KOME call letters were retired from the Bay Area, resurfacing briefly on a small co-owned AM station outside the market.

KOME was inducted into the Rock Radio Hall of Fame in 2014.

Ratings history
The following tables compare KOME's Arbitron average share with those of KSJO and KSAN, over five two-month periods. The data is valid for listeners 12 years and older, from 6 a.m. until midnight, for seven days. In both tables, it appears that KOME began to overtake KSJO significantly in January and February 1979. In the San Francisco nine-county area, KOME actually overtook KSAN slightly in April and May 1979.

KOME personalities

Ally Storm 1990s
Bear (Barry Corkery) also Oregon radio (died 2013)
Billy Vega about 1988–1992 also KSJO KUFX
Bob Lilley 1986–94: news (News Director in Idaho) (Syndicated, various stations with Jeff Blazy)
Bob Simmons early 1970s also KSJO
Brad Lee 1990s
Brian Kay 1986–1987 also KMBY Monterey
Candi Chamberlain 1984–87 Music Director also KSJO KFRC KYA KRQR KTIM KRSH
Captain Reif (Jim Reifschneider) 1970s also KOME, KEZR (died 2004)
Carson Daly, 1990s (MTV, Last Call with Carson Daly)
Cese McGowan early 1970s
Peter B. Collins, 1970s. He switched to talk show host he covered the Watergate Scandal at the age of 19. He was a host on San Francisco's KGO radio and also had a syndicated talk show. Inducted into the Bay Area Radio Hall of Fame in 2021.
Cooper (a.k.a. Ken Chelonis) Late 1980s also KLRB (died 2010)
Craig "The Killer" Kilpatrick 1990s
Dana Jang 1974–85 also KKUP KSJO Group Operations NextMedia Chicago, PD of KBAY and KEZR. Inducted into the Bay Area Radio Hall of Fame in
Dan Stich 1990s (KEZR and KBAY)
Dave Wohlman 1982–98: Production Director, Promotion/Marketing Director, Assistant Program Director, Personality. Host of "The Sunday Morning Time-Machine" and currently hosting "Radio Free Wohlman" (radiofreewohlman.blogspot.com)
Dennis Erectus (Dennis Netto), 1977–92, 1994–97. He was removed from his airshift for decency violations in 1992 then brought back in 1994, after working at KSJO 1993–94. Also on air in San Antonio, Texas and as a production assistant for PD Dana Jang at KBAY/KEZR from 2005 until his heart attack in November 2006. He suffered brain damage and was institutionalized. Because of his lack of health insurance, Netto's friends held fundraisers to help with his medical costs.  He died from a second heart attack on June 13, 2012. Inducted into the Bay Area Radio Hall of Fame in 2013.
Denise Erectus (Donna Volpicella) played Dennis Erectus's sister on the air
Dick Baribou about 1971 with topless young ladies singing station ID, "We're up to our ears in KOME, KOME, KOME"
Don Potoczak early 1970s (died 2012)
Don West 1979; 1981–83; 1984–98 Production; Night DJ, and Engineering also KSFM KMEL KROY-FM
Ed Romig 1975–77 Program Director also WDAI responsible for ending the "free-form" era at KOME
Geno Michelini (Gene Mitchell) 1979–82 also KLOS
Gary Lyte 1971–1973 Astrology Report
Gary T. (Torresani) 1971–72 and 1975–83 also KSJO KLOK
Greg Stone 1978–83 and 1986–98: Stone Trek Import Show, also KUFX
Holly Adams 1990s
Jay William Weed (J. William Weed) 1972–1973: DJ and PD; also KSJO, KGO-FM KSFX
Jack Perry 1979–83 Production Director also CBS SF Radio Group Creative Services Director
Janine Siegel (J9;1987–1998; also KSLY, KRQK and WDEK/WLBK, WNIU)
Jay Cruz 1990s
Jeff Blazy 1987–94 also PD of The Fox Santa Rosa, CA (Syndicated on various stations with Bob Lilley)
Jim Pratt 1990s
Jim Seagull about 1975–76 also KSJO KKSF KWAV KMBY KBPI
Joe Regelski about 1976–77 also KSJO KQAK (News Director KOZT)
Joe "OK" Kelley 1973–78
Johann Schmidt - 1980–1992 - nemesis to Dennis Erectus, and the self-proclaimed President of the San Jose Reagan Youth.
John Higdon 1971–98 Longtime Chief Engineer, "The Classical KOME" host early 1970s (Consultant-Engineer for KBAY and KEZR)
Jona (Jona Denz-Hamilton) 1974–82 also PD of KLRB, PD of KROY-FM KLOK KEEN KFJC. (Longtime Midday jock KBAY)
Karin Nakamura 1976–83 also KUFX (KEZR)
Kelly Cox 1979–83 also KLOS
King Raffi (Raffi Nalvarian) 1992–95 also KEZR KITS
Larry Jacobs 1977 also KLOS, NBC The Source, ABC News Radio
Larry Miles 1990s
Laurie Roberts 1975–85 Longtime PD and DJ KUFX (KPIG KHIP KUFX) Inducted into the Bay Area Radio Hall of Fame in 2011. Died May, 2021.
Leah Raim 1986 The Expressway Talk Show
Les Tracy Program Director 1983–84 also KROY-FM
Lobster (Paul Wells) 1974–76 also KSJO KQKE KLIV. Inducted into the Bay Area Radio Hall of Fame in 2021
Lorraine Meier late 1980s also KLRB KCTY
Lynn Ryder (a.k.a. Lynn Rashkis) 1975–77 News
Mark Goldberg 1979–86 (also News Director KKCS, Colorado Springs)
Mark Sherry early 1970s: DJ and PD; also KFIG, KSJO (Eugene, OR area radio)
Marla Davies 1990s (long-time morning host KEZR, San Jose)
Marshall Phillips late 1980s
Matthew Arnett 1987–1992 also KLRB, KMBY. Became Matthew in the Morning at KTYD, KXFX and WZXL. (KRKC station manager)
Mikel Hunter (a.k.a. Mikel Herrington, Lefty, Oil Can Harry "Captain Mikey") operations manager/Morning DJ, 1977–82 also KMET WYSP KLIV KVYN national voice of Sears (died 1997) Inducted into the Bay Area Radio Hall of Fame in 2008.
Mistress Monique, a dominatrix who appeared regularly on Dennis Erectus's show, was portrayed by writer/comedian Stephanie Landers.
Monnica Sepulveda 1990s frequent guest psychic on morning show
Mother Deal (a.k.a. Michael Deal) early 1970s
Nicci Tyler 1990s
No Name 1990s also KLLC "Alice" (Live 105 morning host)
Pat Evans program director mid-1980s also KFOG, KQED, KFOG, KYA (died 2012)
Peter B. Collins 1976–77 also owner of KRXA (KGO and Syndicated Peter B. Collins show) Inducted into the Bay Area Radio Hall of Fame in 2021.
Phil Charles early 1970s also KSJO KSAN general manager MSU's KGLT (died 2013)
Radley (a.k.a. Brad Wright) 1990s
Ric Curtice 1981–1984
Rob Singleton 1979–83 also news director KJZY
Roger Watson Superfly Sky Hang-Gliding Report
Ron Nenni 1985–98 program director and operations manager
Scary Gary 1990s
Scott Lewis 
Sean Donahue (Sean Coman) 1970s also KSAN (died July 2000)
Stephen Page (Dunwoody) 1973–75 and 1985–95 music director also KSJO KRQR KYOURadio CBS Interactive Music Group
Ted Kopulos 1976–83 movie guy/song parody guy also KSJO's Morning Music Magazine host and KUFX
Tex Wong late 1980s
Tom Ballantyne 1970s
Uncle Frank ("Weird Old Uncle Frank" Bennett) PM Drive and Production 1985–93. Then PM Drive at KUFX 1995–02 (Became "Aunt Fran" in 2002)
Uncle Jack Tossman (Jonny Martin) 1971–74 also KSJO KIFM KOTR (audio man for "Mickey Mouse Club" "Jeopardy" "Wheel of Fortune")
Victor Boc 1972–80 The Expressway Talk Show Host, News Director, jock (Oregon talk show host)
Wapaho Joe (Amadeo) 1971–1975, the "Italian Indian" named by Uncle Jack (Tossman) also future Publisher of BAM Magazine/Assoc Exec Producer BAMMIES 1976–1991
Wendy Hoag about 1972–73
Whipping Boy 1990s<ref>
Wolf (Robert "Ricky" Ricketts) 1971–74

References

External links
KOME tribute page
KOME HOME page
KOME on Facebook
 Edward W. Meece: A Tribute
 June 4, 1998 Metro: KOME chronology since Infinity ownership
 June 4, 1998 Metro: Last two weeks of "Kingdom KOME"
 June 4, 1998 1998 Metro: South Bay radio re-shuffling: "The Big Radio Play"
 June 4, 1998 1998 Metro: "Goodbye, KOME"
 January 21, 2006 Mercury-News blog: "Almost 33 years" KOME Reunion

Defunct radio stations in the United States
Radio stations established in 1959
Radio stations disestablished in 1998
1959 establishments in California
1998 disestablishments in California
OME
OME